Rafael Matos and David Vega Hernández defeated Andrea Vavassori and Jan Zieliński in the final, 6–1, 7–5, to win the doubles tennis title at the 2022 Grand Prix Hassan II.

Jürgen Melzer and Franko Škugor were the defending champions from when the tournament was last held in 2019. Neither returned to defend their title after Melzer retired from professional tennis at the end of 2021 and Škugor withdrew before the beginning of the tournament.

Seeds

Draw

Draw

References

External links
Main draw

Grand Prix Hassan II - 2